Vemmetofte Convent is a former manor house in Faxe Municipality south of Copenhagen, Denmark. It was turned into a convent by Princess Sophia Hedwig of Denmark in 1735. Since 1975 it has provided housing available to the general public.

History

Early history
The oldest known reference to Vemmetofte Manor dates back to 1320 when it was owned by Johannes Offesen, a brother-in-law of Stig Andersen Hvide who owned land both in Skåneland and on Zealand. Later it was owned by members of the aristocratic Brock family from 1464 to 1639. During this early stage of its history it was a strongly fortified house with a ring wall, double moats and draw bridges.

After that it passed through the Brahe, Rosenkrandz and Krabbe families before it was bought by Queen Consort Charlotte Amalie in 1694 as part of a larger acquisition of land in the area. She had plans to turn the property into a convent but died in 1714 before they were carried out.

Prince Charles and Princess Sophie Hedvig

The next owner was Prince Charles of Denmark, Charlotte Amalie's youngest son, who resided at Jægerspris Castle which he had been given by his brother, Frederick IV, who had become king in 1699. Prince Charles immediately embarked on a major renovation and expansion of his new property which it would take nine years to complete.

When Frederick IV had Anne Sophie Reventlow, his spouse by bigamy, crowned as his queen in 1721, it led to a breach between the two brothers, and Prince Charles and their sister, Princess Sophia Hedwig, showed their disapproval by turning their backs on the Court in Copenhagen and taking up residence at Vemmetofte.

At Vemmetofte Manor, Charles and Sophie Hedvig maintained an extravagant household. They had a staff of 70 people supervised by their chamberlain, Carl Adolph von Plessen, who had been a close friend of Prince Charles since their youth

The convent

When Prince Charles died in 1729, he left Vemmetofte to Sophie Hedevig who provided that the estate should be turned into a convent for unmarried women of noble descent on her death. The princess died on 13 March 1738 and Vemmetofte Convent was founded the same year with von Plessen as its first curator. From the beginning the convent suffered from a constrained economy and only survived due to considerable subsidies from von Plessen.

The number of women it accommodated varied over the years but was generally 11. According to the charter they either had to be noblewomen or daughters of men from the three highest ranking classes.

Architecture
Vemmetofte's architecture is a result of a number of successive expansions and adaptions. The current main building was first built in 1500 and later expanded from 1600 to 1630.

Prince Charles' expansion and redesign from 1714 to 1721 was undertaken with the assistance of Johan Conrad Ernst. It adapted the main building to the Baroque style and also added a number of new estate buildings as well as a Baroque garden to the premises.

In 1882 and 1883, the architect Theodor Zeltner carried out a rather rough renovation to a Historicist style which resulted in an unfortunate attempt to recreate a Renaissance castle. In 1907 Acel Berg undertook another major renovation which completely changed its appearance.

Today
Since a revision of its charter in 1975, Vemmetofte has been open to other tenants. The estate covering 2,293 hectares includes Højstrup Manor Marelundsgård.

Churchyard
Notable burials in the associated churchyard include:
 Karen Bardenfleth (18921872), missionary
 Christian Henrik Brasch (17111894), writer, clergy and historian
 Carsten Friis Jespersen (19021988), engineer, CEO and philanthropist
 Maria Nielsen (18821931), headmistress and historian

List of owners
 ( -1349) Johannes Offesen 
 (1349- ) Jens Lauridsen Panter 
 ( - ) Jens Andersen Brock 
 ( -1421) Iven Bryske 
 (1421- ) Johanne Nielsdatter Brock, gift 1) Bryske, 2) von Witzen, 3) Thott 
 ( -1456) Fikke von Witzen 
 (1456- ) Johanne Nielsdatter Brock, gift 1) Bryske, 2) von Witzen, 3) Thott 
 ( -1464) Oluf Axelsen Thott 
 (1464- ) Johanne Nielsdatter Brock, gift 1) Bryske, 2) von Witzen, 3) Thott 
 (1472-1504) Lave Brock 
 (1504-1529) Boet efter Lave Esgesen Brock 
 (1529-1534) Niels Brock 
 (1529-1545) Truid Gregersen Ulfstand 
 (1534-1541) Jytte Podebusk, gift 1) Brock, 2) Gyldenstierne 
 (1541-1544) Knud Gyldenstierne 
 (1544-1565) Lauge Brock 
 (1545-1559) Jens Truidsen Ulfstand 
 (1565-1595) Margrete Esgesdatter Bille, gift Brock 
 (1545-1566) Jens Ulfstand 
 (1566-1575) Niels Ulfstand 
 (1575-1590) Sophie Ulfstand, gift Podebusk 
 (1590-1599) Claus Podebusk 
 (1595-1625) Esge Brock 
 (1625-1640) Tyge Brahe 
 (1640-1641) Axel Brahe 
 (1641-1647) Holger Rosenkrantz 
 (1641) Palle Rosenkrantz 
 (1641-1662) Karen Krabbe, gift 1) Friis, 2) Rosenkrantz 
 (1662-1666) Iver Krabbe 
 (1647-1663) Niels Trolle 
 (1666-1680) Karen Marsvin, gift Krabbe 
 (1680-1694) Anne Sophie Krabbe, gift Urne 
 (1680-1694) Margrete Krabbe, gift 1) Ulfeldt, 2) Rosenkrantz 
 (1694-1714) Queen Charlotte Amalie of Hesse-Kassel
 (1714-1729) Prince Charles of Denmark
 (1729-1735) Princess Sophia Hedwig of Denmark
 (1735- ) Vemmetofte Kloster

References

Manor houses in Faxe Municipality
Castles in Region Zealand
Religious buildings and structures in Denmark
Lutheran women's convents